Armas Adam Toivonen (January 20, 1899, Halikko – September 12, 1973) was a Finnish athlete who mainly competed in the men's marathon during his career.

He competed for Finland at the 1932 Summer Olympics held in Los Angeles, United States where he won the bronze medal in the men's marathon competition.

1899 births
1973 deaths
People from Salo, Finland
People from Turku and Pori Province (Grand Duchy of Finland)
Finnish male long-distance runners
Finnish male marathon runners
Olympic bronze medalists for Finland
Athletes (track and field) at the 1932 Summer Olympics
Olympic athletes of Finland
European Athletics Championships medalists
Medalists at the 1932 Summer Olympics
Olympic bronze medalists in athletics (track and field)
Sportspeople from Southwest Finland